Mavka is a Ukrainian band combining ethnic and folk themes with downtempo, electronica and ambient music.

The band was formed in 2013 by a theater actress Iryna Lazer (lead-singer, composer, performer) and Oleksiy Mikriukov (composer) under the initial name Crossworlds.

Collaborating exclusively on-line they managed to release the first mini-album Ivana Kupala Night in 2014. The full-length Day and Night album was released a year later in 2015.

Since then Iryna Lazer began performing live using loop-station, vocal pedals and synthesizers creating polyphonic compositions in Ukrainian and her own invented 'Mermaid' language. In 2015 another musician joined the band due to the growing amount of live performances and the band's name was changed to Mavka.

In 2016 Mavka appeared on a number of festivals including GogolFest and The Day of Street Music. The band also played on Hi5 studio and performed for the plays in Zoloti Vorota Theater.

In 2017 members of Mavka wrote soundtrack and acted in the movie 'The Tale of Money'. Later the band released music video of the official soundtrack 'Night Shadow'.

In 2018 the band started collaborating with the сhildren's сhoir Dyvo (conductor Tetiana Nadolinska). The band and the choir produced ethnic-electronica compositions and some interpretations of the Ukrainian folk songs. Together they gave the concert 'Horovod under the stars' on May 27 on the stage of Kyiv Planetarium. 

In 2018 band's leader Iryna Lazer recorded vocals for the vinyl LP album Femininho by King Imagine.

On December 25, 2018, the band presented an exclusive Christmas concert "Carols with the looper" in the cultural center Master Class. The main idea of the concert was for the vocalist to create and perform live the polyphonic carols by herself using only the loop-station.

In 2019 the band created an original version of the song 'Hej Sokoly' for a documentary movie 'The Borderline. Hrubieszów operation' which premiered on May, 28, at the Kyiv International Film Festival "Molodist".

In June 2019 the band started collaborating with the German dancer Véronique Langlott and created the music for her choreography research Folkstrance. The artists presented the performance on July 1 at the cultural platform Izolyatsia.

In August 2019 the band re-released the album Day and Night with the "Mavka" band's name.

The band's music is used as a background in plays 'Sasha, throw out the trash' of Kyiv Academic Young Theatre and in "The People Are Singing" of Royal Exchange Theatre.

Name 
The band is named after Ukrainian mythological female long-haired figure Mavka that was believed to live in forests, lakes or rivers and appeared only on special holidays during the year. Mavkas could entice or seduce young men to later tickle their victims to death.

Style and languages 
The majority of songs is written and performed in the Ukrainian language. They are whether interpretations of Ukrainian traditional compositions or original contemporary pieces. The band is also working on an album with the songs written in 'mermaid' glossolalia as the lead-singer calls it.

Discography

Mavka 
 2019: Day and Night (LP)
 2021: Spy
 2021: Гей, соколи (single)
 2022: Gagilka. Die Verwandlung

Crossworlds (2013-2015) 
In 2013-2015 still performing under the band's name 'Crossworlds' the musicians produced two albums independently from any record label. Later on the releases were pirated and published on the music streaming platforms without the knowledge or approval of the copyright holders. In January 2020 after the band submitted multiple copyright claims the infringing content was removed from most of the sites. The only site the releases can be found at is the group's official Bandcamp page:

 2014: Ivana Kupala Night (EP)
 2015: Day and Night (LP)

Official pages 
Facebook
BandCamp
Spotify
Instagram
YouTube
Apple Music
Google Play
SoundCloud
YouTube Music
Deezer
Napster
Tidal

References

External links 

 Mavka - Internet Encyclopedia of Ukraine

Ukrainian folk music
Ukrainian musical groups
Ukrainian electronic musicians